Spital or Spittal may refer to:

Places

Austria
Spital (Weitra), a hamlet in the Waldviertel, Lower Austria, notable for being the origin of some of Adolf Hitler's family
Spital am Pyhrn, a municipality in Upper Austria
Spital am Semmering, a municipality in Styria, in the southeast
 , a hamlet of the municipality of Schäffern in Styria, in the southeast
Spittal an der Drau, a town in Carinthia, in the southwest
 Bezirk Spittal an der Drau, an administrative district (Bezirk) in the state of Carinthia, whose main city is Spittal an der Drau

Bermuda
Spittal Pond Nature Reserve

United Kingdom

England
Spital, Berkshire, a part of Windsor
Spital, Derbyshire, part of Chesterfield
Spittal, East Riding of Yorkshire, a location
Spitalfields, in London's East End
Spital-in-the-Street, a hamlet in Lincolnshire
Spital, Merseyside, on the Wirral Peninsula
Spital railway station
Spittal, Northumberland, a seaside resort
Spital, Tamworth, a Ward of Tamworth Borough Council
Spital Tongues, an area of Newcastle upon Tyne
Spital Brook, a tributary of the River Lea in Hertfordshire

Scotland
Spittal, Auchterderran, a town in Fife
Spittal, Dumfries and Galloway, a location
Spittal, East Lothian
Spittal of Glenshee in eastern Perth and Kinross
Spittal, Highland
Spittal, South Lanarkshire, a neighbourhood of Rutherglen
Spittal, Kilmaronock, a location in Stirling council area
Spittal, a part of Stirling, an historic town
Spittal-on-Rule, Scottish Borders

Wales
Spittal, Pembrokeshire, a village in the southwest

Surname
  (1925–2007), bishop of Trier 1981–2001
Charles Spittal (1874–1931), Canadian athlete and soldier
Ian Spittal (born 1965), Scottish footballer
Blair Spittal (born 1995), Scottish footballer
Sir James Spittal (1769–1842), Lord Provost of Edinburgh 1833–1837

Other uses
SV Spittal, an association football club based in Spittal an der Drau, Austria